Dungeons & Dragons novels are works of fantasy fiction that are based upon campaign settings released for the Dungeons & Dragons role-playing game.

History
The first novel based on the Dungeons & Dragons game was Quag Keep (1978) by Andre Norton. Based upon Norton's first experience at playing the Dungeons & Dragons game, it told the story of seven gamers who were drawn into a fantasy setting. The sequel, Return to Quag Keep (2006), was published after Norton had died in 2005.

A series of authorized novels began in the early 1980s with a survey of Advanced Dungeons & Dragons players. The feedback indicated that the players wanted more dragons in the media products from TSR, Inc. In May, 1983, TSR commissioned Tracy Hickman to produce a new campaign setting that would be called Dragonlance. For marketing purposes, TSR also decided to release a series of books based in the same setting. The first three books became the highly successful Dragonlance Chronicles Trilogy.

As the time and cost needed to develop a commercial role-playing game are rarely matched by the profits made from selling the end product, the rulebooks are primarily sold to create a market for the sale of related products. TSR found a lucrative market when they released a series spinoff novels based on the Dragonlance and Dark Sun campaign settings. These novels stood on their own and did not require knowledge of the game rules, making them accessible by a more general audience. TSR published several gamebook series, such as Endless Quest, Advanced Dungeons & Dragons Adventure Gamebooks, Fantasy Forest, and HeartQuest, which were based on the D&D settings.

The most successful of the novel series produced by TSR during the 1990s were the books based upon the Forgotten Realms and Dragonlance settings. These works also proved to have an unusual shelf life, remaining in print for at least a decade. As a result, some fantasy fiction authors that were introduced through the TSR novels became popular authors. Among these are R. A. Salvatore and the writing partnership of Margaret Weis and Tracy Hickman. Before they went bankrupt in 1997, TSR had published 242 novels based in their campaign settings, with 55 set in the Dragonlance setting and 64 set in the world of Forgotten Realms. TSR's novels were published in ten languages and some made it on to international best seller lists. Other publishers followed the TSR model, including FASA, White Wolf and West End Games.

By the 2000s, a significant portion of all fantasy paperbacks sales were being published by Wizards of the Coast, the American game company that acquired TSR in 1997. The works of R. A. Salvatore in particular have proven very popular, with his novels appearing on The New York Times best seller list 22 times as of 2010.

In 2021, HarperCollins Children's Books announced exclusive rights to publish Dungeons & Dragons middle grade books such as "novels, illustrated chapter books, and graphic novels".

Authors

The following authors have written one or more full length Dungeons & Dragons novels:

 Lynn Abbey
 Mark Anthony
 Robin Wayne Bailey
 Keith Baker
 Richard Baker
 Don Bassingthwaite
 Elaine Bergstrom
 John Gregory Betancourt
 Edward Bolme
 Timothy Brown
 Richard Lee Byers
 Andria Cardarelle
 Tonya R. Carter
 Scott Ciencin
 Adrian Cole
 David Cook
 Monte Cook
 Bruce Cordell
 Paul Crilley
 Elaine Cunningham
 Tina Daniell
 Graeme Davis
 James P. Davis
 Erik Scott de Bie
 Keith R. A. DeCandido
 Troy Denning
 Gene DeWeese
 Parker DeWolf
 P. N. Elrod
 Ru Emerson
 Clayton Emery
 Rose Estes
 Erin M. Evans
 Nigel Findley
 Matt Forbeck
 Kameron M. Franklin
 Ed Gentry
 Christie Golden
 Ed Greenwood
 Dave Gross
 Jeff Grubb
 Thorarinn Gunnarsson
 Gary Gygax
 Laurell K. Hamilton
 Simon Hawke
 D.J. Heinrich
 Samantha Henderson
 Tracy Hickman
 Russ T. Howard
 Tanya Huff
 Ryan Hughes
 Jaliegh Johnson
 Drew Karpyshyn
 Paul S. Kemp
 Paul Kidd
 J. Robert King
 Mary Kirchoff
 Jess Lebow
 Jeff LaSala
 James Lowder
 Dixie Lee McKeone
 Victor Milán
 Roger E. Moore
 Douglas Niles
 Kate Novak
 Mel Odom
 David A. Page
 Dan Parkinson
 Ellen Porath
 Thomas M. Reid
 Marsheila Rockwell
 R. A. Salvatore
 Mark Sehestetd
 Morris Simon
 Bill Slavicsek
 Lisa Smedman
 Kevin Stein
 Keith Francis Strohm
 Paul B. Thompson
 Tim Waggoner
 Margaret Weis
 Michael Williams
 Chet Williamson
 Steve Winter
 Rich Wulf
 James Wyatt

Campaign settings 
The following Dungeons & Dragons campaign settings have had one or more published novels based in the same fantasy world:

 Birthright
 Dark Sun
 Dragonlance
 Eberron
 Forgotten Realms
 Greyhawk
 Kara-Tur
 Mystara
 Planescape
 Ravenloft
 Spelljammer

References